Bradley Forbes-Cryans (born 25 March 1995) is a British slalom canoeist who has competed at the international level since 2012.

He won three medals in the K1 team event at the ICF Canoe Slalom World Championships with a gold in 2018, a silver in 2022 and a bronze in 2015. He also won a silver and a bronze medal in the K1 team event at the European Championships. He earned his best senior world championship result, of 4th, at the 2019 ICF Canoe Slalom World Championships in La Seu d'Urgell.

Bradley represented Great Britain in the K1 event at the delayed 2020 Summer Olympics in Tokyo, finishing in 6th place.

World Cup individual podiums

References

External links

1995 births
Scottish male canoeists
Living people
Medalists at the ICF Canoe Slalom World Championships
Olympic canoeists of Great Britain
Canoeists at the 2020 Summer Olympics